International Literature Award (German: Internationaler Literaturpreis – Haus der Kulturen der Welt) is a German literary award for international prose translated into German for the first time. The prize has been awarded annually by the Haus der Kulturen der Welt and the foundation “Elementarteilchen” since 2009. Winning authors receive €20,000 and the translators €15,000. The award has compared as the German near-equivalent of the Best Translated Book Award or Independent Foreign Fiction Prize.

Winners and shortlists

Blue Ribbon = winner

2009

  Author Daniel Alarcón and translator Friederike Meltendorf for Lost City Radio (Wagenbach Verlag)

2010

  Marie NDiaye and translator Claudia Kalscheuer for Drei starke Frauen (Orig: Trois femmes puissantes) (Suhrkamp Verlag)

2011

  Michail Schischkin and translator Andreas Tretner for Venushaar (Orig: Venerin Volos) (DVA)

2012

 Jaume Cabré, Jo confesso (Catalan, trans. Kirsten Brandt and Petra Zickmann)
  Mircea Cărtărescu, Corpul (Romanian, trans. Gerhardt Csejka and Ferdinand Leopold)
 Nedim Gürsel, Allah’ ιn Kιzlarι (Turkish, trans. Barbara Yurtdas)
 Tom McCarthy, C. (English, trans. Bernhard Robben)
 Péter Nádas, Párhuzamos történetek (Hungarian, trans. Christina Viragh) 
 Téa Obreht, The Tiger’s Wife (English, trans. Bettina Abarbanell)

2013

 Andrej Bitow, Prepodavatel' simmetrii (Russian, trans. Rosemarie Tietze)
  Teju Cole, Open City (English, trans. Christine Richter-Nilsson)
 Lloyd Jones, Hand Me Down World (English, trans. Grete Osterwald)
 Valeria Luiselli, Los Ingrávidos (Spanish, trans. Dagmar Ploetz-Timm)
 Zakhar Prilepin, Sankya (Russian, trans. Erich Klein and Susanne Macht) 
 Jean Rolin, Un chien mort après lui (French, trans. Holger Fock and Sabine Müller)

2014

 Zsófia Bán, Amikor még csak az állatok éltek (Hungarian, trans. Terézia Mora)
 Georgi Gospodinov, Fizika na tagata (Bulgarian, trans. Alexander Sitzmann)
 Mohsin Hamid, How to Get Filthy Rich in Rising Asia (English, trans. Eike Schönfeld)
 Bernardo Kucinski, K. (Portuguese, trans. Sarita Brandt) 
  Dany Laferrière, L'énigme du retour (French, trans. Beate Thill)
 Madeleine Thien, Dogs at the Perimeter (English, trans. Almuth Carstens)

2015
 NoViolet Bulawayo, We Need New Names (English, trans. Miriam Mandelkow)
 Patrick Chamoiseau, L'empreinte à Crusoé (French, trans. Beate Thill)
 Daša Drndić, Sonnenschein (French, trans. Brigitte Döbert & Blanka Stipetić)
 Gilbert Gatore, Le Passé devant soi (French, trans. Katja Meintel)
  Amos Oz, Habesora al pi Jehuda (Hebrew, trans. Mirjam Pressler) 
 Krisztina Tóth, Akvárium (Hungarian, trans. György Buda)

2016
  Shumona Sinha, Assommons les pauvres! (French, trans. Lena Müller)

2017
  Fiston Mwanza Mujila, Tram 83 (trans. from French by Katharina Meyer and Lena Müller)

2018
  Ivana Sajko, Liebesroman (trans. by Alida Bremer)

2019
  Fernanda Melchor, Temporada de huracanes (trans. from Spanish by Angelica Ammar)

2021
  Fatima Daas, Die jüngste Tochter (trans. from French by Sina de Malafosse)

2022
  Cristina Morales, Leichte Sprache (trans. from Spanish by Friederike von Crieger)

References

External links
International Literature Award, official website.

Awards established in 2009
German literary awards
Translation awards
German-language literary awards